Cyclodinus mimus is a species of antlike flower beetle in the family Anthicidae. It is found in Central America and North America.

References

Further reading

 
 

Anthicidae
Articles created by Qbugbot
Beetles described in 1895
Beetles of Central America
Beetles of North America